Vijayanum Veeranum is a 1979 Indian Malayalam film,  directed by C. N. Venkita Swamy. The film stars Prem Nazir, Seema, Jose Prakash and Shubha in the lead roles. This movie was the second highest big budget South Indian movie at that time. The film has musical score by A. T. Ummer.

Cast
Prem Nazir as Vijayan & Veeran
Seema as Maya
Jose Prakash as Surendran Nair
Shubha as Malini
T. R. Omana
Alummoodan as Appu
 Kunchan as Romeshi
Elizabeth
Janardanan as Prakash
P. K. Abraham as Shivasankaran
 Jaggi as Appu
 A.T.Samuel(Sam)
 Rajashekaran

Soundtrack
The music was composed by A. T. Ummer and the lyrics were written by Chirayinkeezhu Ramakrishnan Nair.

References

External links
 

1979 films
1970s Malayalam-language films